Basic Education High School No. 2 Botataung (commonly known as Botataung 2 High School or St. Philip's High School), located in Botataung township, is a public high school in Yangon. The school's main building is a landmark protected by the city, and is listed on the Yangon City Heritage List.

References

High schools in Yangon
Educational institutions established in 1945
1945 establishments in Burma